Benjamin Hazard (1774–1841) was a Rhode Island legislator, attorney and member of the Hartford Convention.

Hazard was born on September 9, 1774 in Middletown, Rhode Island. He graduated from Brown University in the class of 1792 and later married Harriet Lyman, daughter of Daniel Lyman and Mary Wanton. Hazard then studied the law, and was admitted to the bar in 1796 and started a law practice in Newport, Rhode Island. In 1809, he was first elected a Representative from Newport and served as Speaker of the House from October 1816, to May 1818. Hazard retired from the Rhode Island General Assembly in 1840. He died in his Wanton-Lyman-Hazard House on March 10, 1841. Hazard was an active member of Trinity Church in Newport.

References

1770 births
1841 deaths
Brown University alumni
Members of the Rhode Island House of Representatives
Speakers of the Rhode Island House of Representatives
Hazard family of Rhode Island